Francesco Graziani (April 26, 1828 – June 30, 1901) was an Italian baritone and voice teacher. Graziani has been called the first modern baritone because his vocal attributes were well suited to the high-lying operatic parts composed by Giuseppe Verdi, with whom he worked.

Early life and career
Graziani was born in 1828 in Fermo, Italy. His older brother, Lodovico Graziani (1820–1885), was a dramatic tenor.

He studied with Cellini and made his debut In Italy in 1851 at Ascoli Piceno in Donizetti's Gemma di Vergy. The next season, he sang in Macerata, performing Francesco in Verdi's I masnadieri.
 
Graziani also appeared at the Salle Ventadour with the Théâtre-Italien from 1853 to 1861, where he particularly excelled in the operas of Verdi, creating for Paris the role of Count di Luna in Il trovatore and also singing Germont in La traviata, the title role in Rigoletto, and Renato in Un ballo in maschera.

In the summer of 1854, he performed with Max Maretzek's Italian opera company at Castle Garden in New York City.

He appeared at the Royal Opera House, Covent Garden from 1855 to 1880. His debut was on April 26 as Carlos in Verdi's Ernani, followed by Count di Luna in Verdi's Il Trovatore on May 10, Riccardo in Bellini's I puritani on May 17, Alfonso in Donizetti's La favorita on May 24, and Iago in Rossini's Otello on August 7. He performed the role of Nelusco in the 1865 London premiere of Giacomo Meyerbeer's L'Africaine. Among the other roles he sang in London were the title role in Rigoletto, Renato in Un ballo in maschera, Posa in Don Carlo, and Amonasro in Aida (all by Verdi). His last performance at the house was as Germont in La traviata with Adelina Patti on July 17 in the final performance of the 1880 season.

At St Petersburg, on 10 November 1862, he had cemented a spot in operatic history by creating the role of Don Carlos in the first performance of Verdi's La forza del destino.

The range of Graziani's voice extended up to A4 and it was much praised by contemporary critics for its smoothness, beauty and ease of production, but his histrionic skills were said to be of a less compelling standard.

Graziani later moved to Berlin where he became a voice teacher. Among his pupils was the American soprano Geraldine Farrar.

He died on June 30, 1901 at his birthplace, Fermo, in Italy.

During his career, Graziani had faced strong competition on stage from a number of other outstanding Italian baritones. Probably the greatest of his immediate rivals was Roman-born Antonio Cotogni, whose voice was of similar quality and range to Graziani's.

Graziani brothers
Francesco Graziani had three brothers who also sang professionally:
 Giuseppe Graziani (born Fermo, August 28, 1819; died Porto San Giorgio, March 6, 1905) was a bass. He studied with Saverio Mercadante in Naples and performed primarily in concerts.
 Lodovico Graziani (born Fermo, November 14, 1820; died Fermo, May 15, 1885) became a well-known tenor. He created the role of Alfredo in Verdi's La traviata at La Fenice.
 Vincenzo Graziani (born Fermo, February 16, 1836; died Fermo, November 2, 1906) became a baritone. His debut in 1862 was as Belcore in Donizetti's L'elisir d'amore. He gave up his career early, after an illness caused him to become partially deaf.

References

Sources
Kuhn, Laura, editor (2000). Baker's Dictionary of Opera. New York: Schirmer. .
Rosenthal, Harold (1958). Two Centuries of Opera at Covent Garden. London: Putnam. .
Sadie, Stanley, editor (1992). The New Grove Dictionary of Opera (4 volumes). London: Macmillan. .
Sadie, Stanley, editor (2001). The New Grove Dictionary of Music and Musicians, 2nd edition. London: Macmillan.  (hardcover).  (eBook).

1828 births
1901 deaths
People from Fermo
Italian operatic baritones
19th-century Italian male opera singers